Gottlob is a family name, which may refer to:

 Georg Gottlob, Austrian computer scientist

Gottlob is a given name, which may refer to:

 Gottlob Berger (1896–1975), senior German Nazi official 
 Gottlob Burmann (1737–1805), German Romantic poet and lipogrammatist
 Gottlob Frege (1848–1925), German philosopher, logician and mathematician
 Gottlob Frick (1906–1994), German operatic bass
 Gottlob E. Weiss (1820–1900), American politician

Gottlob as a middle name may refer to:

 Christian August Gottlob Eberhard (1769–1845), German writer
 Christian Gottlob Heine (1729–1812), German classical scholar and archaeologist
 Johann Gottlob Lehmann (disambiguation)
 Johann Gottlob Lehmann (classicist) (1782–1837) German expert in classical studies and noted director of the Gymnasium at Luckau, Germany
 Johann Gottlob Lehmann (scientist) (1719–1767) German mineralogist and geologist
 Johann Gottlob Leidenfrost (1715–1794), German doctor and theologian who first described the scientific phenomenon eponymously named the Leidenfrost effect
 Adam Gottlob Moltke (1710–1792), Danish courtier, statesman and diplomat
 Christoph Gottlob Müller (1785–1858), Considered to be the founder of the Wesleyan Church in Germany
 Christian Gottlob Neefe (1748–1798), German opera composer and conductor
 Adam Gottlob Oehlenschläger (1779–1850), Danish poet and playwright
 Johann Gottlob Theaenus Schneider (1750–1822), German classicist and naturalist
 Eugen Gottlob Winkler (1912–1936), German writer and essayist
 Karl Gottlob Zumpt (1792–1849), German classical scholar known for his work in the field of Latin philology

Gottlob may also refer to the following places:
 Gottlob, a commune in the Timiș County, Romania

See also 
 Gottlober
 Gottlieb

German masculine given names